National Democratic Front (in Spanish: Frente Democrático Nacional) was a political party in Peru that was founded in 1945 in Arequipa by Manuel J. Bustamante de la Fuente. Future president Fernando Belaúnde Terry was also present during the party's foundation. The party later formed an alliance with APRA and the Peruvian Communist Party, an alliance which led to the triumph of Dr. José Luis Bustamante y Rivero becoming president the same year.

Defunct political parties in Peru
Political parties established in 1945
Political parties with year of disestablishment missing